Antone Kuckuk (February 10, 1863 – October 4, 1946) was a member of the Wisconsin State Assembly and the Wisconsin State Senate.

Biography
Kuckuk was born to German immigrants on February 10, 1863, in Schleisingerville, Wisconsin. He relocated to Shawano, Wisconsin, in 1882. He married Mary E. Pulcifer on October 20, 1885, and they had two children. He died in Shawano on October 4, 1946. At the time, he was vice-president of the Four Wheel Drive Auto Company.

Career
Kuckuk was a member of the Shawano, Wisconsin School Board and was elected to the Shawano County, Wisconsin Board in 1893. He was elected to the state assembly in 1907. Kuckuk was elected to the state senate in 1916 and re-elected in 1920. He was a Republican.

References

External links

People from Slinger, Wisconsin
People from Shawano, Wisconsin
County supervisors in Wisconsin
Republican Party Wisconsin state senators
Republican Party members of the Wisconsin State Assembly
School board members in Wisconsin
American people of German descent
1863 births
1946 deaths
Burials in Wisconsin